Aditi Singh may refer to:

 Aditi Singh (actress) (born 1995), Indian actress
 Aditi Singh (politician) (born 1987), Indian politician

See also
 Aditi Singh Sharma (born 1986), Indian playback singer